Gabriel Rivera-Barraza (born in Durango, Mexico) is an author and the founder of GRB Communications. He is the co-author of Nuevo New York (2016).

References

1975 births
Living people
Mexican male writers
Writers from Durango
People from Santiago Papasquiaro